During the Parade of Nations section of the 1994 Winter Olympics opening ceremony, athletes from each country participating in the Olympics paraded in the arena, preceded by name board bearers with a couple between them, and also the country flag. The flag was borne by a sportsperson from that country chosen either by the National Olympic Committee or by the athletes themselves to represent their country. The Parade of Nations was organized according to the Bokmål Norwegian alphabet. As usual, Greece leads the parade, followed by American Samoa.Due logistical troubles, Mongolia did not march in the parade, but still compete in the Games. The announcers welcomed the country in their respective national language, English, and lastly French.

List
Below is a list of parading countries and their announced flag bearer, in the same order as the parade. This is sortable by country name, flag bearer's name and flag bearer's sport. Names are given in the form officially designated by the IOC.

References 

1994 Winter Olympics
Lists of Olympic flag bearers